MC Duke (later just Duke) was a British rapper from the East End of London, who recorded with DJ Leader 1. He was one of the pioneers of the early British hardcore sound and later went on to record as IC3.

Biography
Duke began his career at a DMC World Championships after show party, where the winner of the MC battle competition got on stage and boasted that he would beat any rapper who challenged him. Duke climbed on stage to take the challenge, and emerged victorious. The battle was witnessed by Derek Bowland, who was acting as an A&R man for Music of Life records. He quickly arranged a meeting between Duke and Simon Harris, the head of the record label, where instead of bringing a demo tape, Duke rapped live in Harris' office. Harris agreed to sign him.

He debuted with the track "Jus-Dis" on the compilation album Hard as Hell (Music of Life, 1987) - an album which also included Overlord X's first track before he was later signed by Mango Records: in later years, Duke and X would develop a grudge that led to both recording records to belittle the other. In 1988, Duke was support to Salt-N-Pepa on their UK tour.

A series of singles followed, with Duke finally pairing with longtime partner DJ Leader 1 (sometimes DJ Leader One) on the single "Throw Your Hands in The Air" (Music of Life, 1989) and adding his name to the sleeve with Duke right up to their reincarnation as IC3 for the EPs Excalibur (Shut Up and Dance, 1992) and Untitled (Shut Up and Dance, 1992).

1989 saw Duke and Leader 1's first album - Organised Rhyme (Music of Life, 1989), and it was heavily featured on Music of Life's 1989 Hustlers Convention album. Later lampooned by Overlord X for having Duke on the cover "looking like a farmer" - and their most famous single, "I'm Riffin' (English Rasta)" (Music of Life, 1989). The single was popular amongst hip hop fans, and received radio airplay and often crops up on compilation albums.

More singles followed, as well as the follow-up album Return of the Dread-I (Music of Life, 1991), but Duke parted company with Music of Life. Following this, he guested on other artist's tracks - such as Phat Skillz' "Dress Like Your Enemy"/"Phat Skillz"  (Effect, 1992) before moving to the Shut Up and Dance record label for the IC3 project.

An album for Shut Up and Dance never materialised, but Duke continued to guest on other artist's tunes, such as Lisa Pin-Up, DJ Elvira & DJ Modelle's "Another Jam" (Rock Hard Recordings, 2000). Following this, Duke disappeared from the limelight, although his track "I'm Riffin' (English Rasta)" was sampled for C90's dance hit "Miracle Maker (I'm Riffin)" (Twenty-Three Seven Recordings, 2001). During 1995, he served as an MC on long-running London pirate radio station, Kool FM.

In 2007, he also appeared in UK hip hop artist Charlie Sloth's song, "Can't Forget About UK". The song was a tribute to pioneering rappers from the UK.

Duke usually appeared at live events and in videos with his backing dancers Billy Boy and Seeker. Both featured on the front cover of the Organised Rhyme album.

Discography
 Organised Rhyme (Music of Life, 1989)
 Return of the Dread-I (Music of Life, 1991)

Live album
Hustlers Convention (with other hip-hop artists) (1989)

References

External links
Heroes of UK Hip Hop's Duke page
Heroes of UK Hip Hop's IC3 page
MC Duke interview by Pete Lewis, 'Blues & Soul' January 2011

Black British male rappers
English male rappers
Living people
Rappers from London
Year of birth missing (living people)